Ymir is the father of the race of giants in Norse mythology and the grandfather of Odin, King of the Gods.

Ymir may also refer to:

 Ymir (moon), a moon of Saturn named after the giant
 Ymir (Marvel Comics), the equivalent being as represented in the universe of Marvel Comics
 Ymir, British Columbia, a town in British Columbia's Kootenay district
 Two different characters in the Japanese comic and cartoon series Attack on Titan:
 Ymir, an owner of the Jaw Titan
 Ymir Fritz ( Ymir the Founder)
 Ymir (electoral district), a now defunct provincial electoral district of British Columbia
 Ymir, the Venusian creature from the film 20 Million Miles to Earth

See also
 Ymer (disambiguation)